Five ships and two establishments of the Royal Navy have borne the name HMS Indus, after the Indus River:

Ships
 was a storeship, formerly an East Indiaman. She was purchased in 1790, but her fate is unknown.
 was a 74-gun third-rate ship of the line launched in 1812. She was renamed HMS Bellona in 1818, used for harbour service from 1840 and was broken up in 1868.
 was an iron paddle gunboat launched in 1838 and listed until 1843.
 was an 80-gun second-rate ship of the line launched in 1839. She was used as a guard ship from 1860 and was sold in 1898.
 was a gunvessel launched in 1851. Her fate is unknown.

Establishments
HMS Indus was the name assigned to the Devonport guard ship and flagship of the Port Admiral, between 1860 and 1905:
 was the original guard ship between 1860 and 1898.
 was HMS Indus for a few months in 1898.
 was the mechanics' training establishment and workshops at Devonport between 1906 and 1922. A number of ships were renamed whilst serving as depot and base ships for the establishment:
 was renamed HMS Indus in 1898, commissioned as the establishment in 1906, renamed HMS Indus I in 1910 and was paid off in 1922.
 was HMS Indus II between 1910 and 1914.
 was HMS Indus II between 1915 and 1918. 
 was HMS Indus II between 1920 and 1922.
 was HMS Indus III between 1910 and 1922.
 was HMS Indus IV between 1904 and 1906.
 was HMS Indus IV between 1910 and 1914.
 was HMS Indus V between 1910 and 1922.

See also
 was a  sloop of the Royal Indian Navy launched in 1934 and sunk in 1942.

Royal Navy ship names